The Scissor Sisters are a pop band from New York.

Scissor Sisters may also refer to:
 Scissor Sisters (album), the eponymous band's 2004 debut studio recording 
 Scissor Sisters (convicted killers),  two sisters from Dublin convicted of murder in 2005
 Scissor sister, pejorative slang meaning lesbian